The 2010 Barking and Dagenham Council election took place on 6 May 2010 to elect members of Barking and Dagenham London Borough Council in London, England.

The whole council was up for election and the Labour Party retained control of the council winning all of the seats.  The British National Party lost all the seats they had gained in 2006. The Conservatives lost their only remaining seat and the Liberal Democrats failed to regain any seats they had lost four years earlier.

The 2010 general election was held on the same day, which increased turnout. The elections took place on the same day as other local elections in 2010.

At the 2006 election, Labour had won 38 seats, the BNP 12 and the Conservatives 1.

Background
188 candidates nominated in total. Labour again ran a full slate (51) and was the only party to do so. By contrast the Conservative Party ran 41 candidates , the Liberal Democrats ran 20 and the BNP ran 34 whilst there were 20 Independent candidates.

Election results

Ward results

Abbey

Alibon

Becontree

Chadwell Heath

Eastbrook

Eastbury

Gascoigne

Goresbrook

Heath

Longbridge

Mayesbrook

Parsloes

River

Thames

Valence

Village

Whalebone

By-elections between 2010 and 2014

Goresbrook

The by-election was called following the voiding of the election of Cllr. Louise Couling as she was ruled ineligible.

The by-election was called following the resignation of Cllr. Louise Couling for reasons of ill health.

Longbridge

The by-election was called following the death of Cllr. Nirmal Gill.

References

2010
Barking and Dagenham London Borough Council election
Barking and Dagenham London Borough Council election